Wu Jiayu (born 30 April 1997) is a Chinese sport shooter.

He participated at the 2018 ISSF World Shooting Championships.

References

External links

Living people
1997 births
Chinese male sport shooters
ISSF pistol shooters
Shooters at the 2014 Summer Youth Olympics
Asian Games medalists in shooting
Shooters at the 2018 Asian Games
Asian Games gold medalists for China
Medalists at the 2018 Asian Games
21st-century Chinese people